Assara decipula is a species of snout moth in the genus Assara. It was described by Clarke in 1986. It is found in French Polynesia.

References

Moths described in 1986
Phycitini
Moths of Oceania